Dwarf hamster may refer to:
A member of any of the three species of genus Phodopus:
Campbell's dwarf hamster
Djungarian hamster
Roborovski hamster
A member of certain species of genus Cricetulus:
Tibetan dwarf hamster
Chinese dwarf hamster
Kam dwarf hamster
Long-tailed dwarf hamster
Grey dwarf hamster
Sokolov's dwarf hamster

Animal common name disambiguation pages